Mississippi Gambler is a 1942 American crime film directed by John Rawlins and written by Al Martin and Roy Chanslor. The film stars Kent Taylor, Frances Langford, John Litel, Shemp Howard, Claire Dodd and Wade Boteler. The film was released on April 17, 1942, by Universal Pictures.

Plot

Cast        
Kent Taylor as Johnny Forbes
Frances Langford as Beth Cornell
John Litel as Jim Hadley aka Francis Carvel
Shemp Howard as Milton Davis 
Claire Dodd as Gladys La Verne
Wade Boteler as Eric Brandon
Douglas Fowley as Chet Matthews
Aldrich Bowker as Judd Higgins 
Eddie Dunn as Dexter
Harry Hayden as Sheriff Dan Calkins
David Oliver as Croupier
Eddie Acuff as Everett
Paul Phillips as Sid
George H. Reed as Roy
Alexander Lockwood as Spence
Robert Barron as Bert

References

External links
 

1942 films
American crime films
1942 crime films
Universal Pictures films
Films directed by John Rawlins
American black-and-white films
1940s English-language films
1940s American films